Ryan Clifton Alexander De La Harpe (born 2 September 1982) is a former Namibian rugby union player who played as a scrum-half represented Namibia internationally from 2011 to 2014 and currently serves as a head coach for Vagabonds' club. Ryan De La Harpe is regarded as one of the finest scrum-halves to have played for Namibia.

Career 
Ryan De La Harpe made his international debut for Namibia against Romania on 10 June 2011 prior to the World Cup call. He was included in the Namibian squad for the 2011 Rugby World Cup following the successful outing with Birmingham Moseley Rugby Club and featured in three group stage matches. In 2014, he notably became the first Namibian to play for the famous Barbarians F. C. Ryan also played for few English Rugby Union Clubs such as Fylde Rugby Club, Birmingham Moseley Rugby Club and Letchworth Garden City Rugby Club and Lancashire County Rugby Football Union.

He retired from international rugby in 2014 and pursued his career through coaching professionally. He had coaching stints with Myerscough College, Lancashire County Rugby Football Union, Lancaster University. He was appointed as the head coach of Vagabond's Rugby Club in August 2018.

References 

1982 births
Living people
Fylde Rugby Club players
Moseley Rugby Football Club players
Namibia international rugby union players
Namibian rugby union players
Rugby union players from Walvis Bay
Rugby union scrum-halves